Edens Edge was an American country music band founded by Hannah Blaylock (lead vocals), Dean Berner (vocals, guitar, Dobro), and Cherrill Green (vocals, mandolin, banjo, guitar). The band was signed to Big Machine Records which released their self-titled debut album. It included the singles "Amen" and "Too Good to Be True". The group disbanded in 2013 when Blaylock departed.

History
The three members of Edens Edge are natives of Arkansas. They won a contest sponsored by CMT in 2006, where they met Nashville songwriter Kye Fleming. They moved to Nashville in 2007. The group eventually signed a record deal with Big Machine Records in April 2010, and the trio's debut single, "Amen," was released in April 2011. It has become the group's first Top 20 hit. Their self-titled debut album was released on June 12, 2012. "Too Good to Be True" was released as the album's second and final single on April 9, 2012.

In March 2013, it was announced that Edens Edge had parted ways with Big Machine Records and member Hannah Blaylock had left the band. Blaylock auditioned for The Voice in 2018 but failed to be picked to a team.

Discography

Studio albums

EPs

Singles

Other charted songs

Music videos

References

American country music groups
Big Machine Records artists
Musical groups from Arkansas
Musical groups established in 2006
Musical groups disestablished in 2013
American musical trios